Slayer is a horizontally scrolling shooter developed by Imperial Software for the Amiga, Atari ST, and Commodore 64. Hewson Consultants published the game in 1988. The game consists of three levels, each with a boss which must be defeated at the end. Power-ups such as bonus weapons and shields scattered around the levels.

References

External links

Slayer at Atari Mania

1988 video games
Amiga games
Atari ST games
Commodore 64 games
Hewson Consultants games
Horizontally scrolling shooters
Single-player video games
Video games developed in the United Kingdom